The  is the 41st edition of the Japan Academy Film Prize, an award presented by the Nippon Academy-Sho Association to award excellence in filmmaking. It awarded the best films of 2017 and it took place on March 2, 2018 at the Grand Prince Hotel New Takanawa in Tokyo, Japan.

Winners & Nominees

Awards

References

External links 
  - 

Japan Academy Film Prize
2017 in Japanese cinema
Japan Academy Film Prize
March 2018 events in Japan